Mara Alagic is a Serbian mathematics educator and the editor-in-chief of the Journal of Mathematics and the Arts. She is an Associate Professor in the Department of Curriculum and Instruction and Graduate Coordinator at Wichita State University.

Education
Alagic obtained her Bachelor of Science in Mathematics, her Master's of Science in Mathematics and her PhD from the University of Belgrade in Yugoslavia. Her Master's thesis was on Category of Multivalued Mappings (Hypertopology). She completed her PhD in 1985 under the direction of Ðuro Kurepa; her dissertation title was Categorical Views of Some Relational Models.

Books
Alagic is the co-author of the book Locating Intercultures: Educating for Global Collaboration (2010). In addition, with Glyn M. Rimmington of Wichita State University, Alagic wrote the book Third place learning: Reflective inquiry into intercultural and global cage painting (Information Age Publishing, 2012).

References

External links
 
 Mara Alagic ResearchGate Profile

Year of birth missing (living people)
Living people
Serbian mathematicians
21st-century American mathematicians
Women mathematicians
Mathematics educators
University of Belgrade alumni
Wichita State University faculty